Tournan-en-Brie (literally Tournan in Brie), or simply Tournan, is a commune in the Seine-et-Marne department in the Île-de-France region in north-central France. It is located in the Paris metropolitan area.

History

In the fourteenth century a castle was mentioned belonging to the House of Garlande, whose lords were Guy de Garlande (who still lived in 1186), Anseau Ier de Garlande (of which there is no title), Anseau II de Garlande (who lived in 1192), Robert of Garlande and Anseau III of Garlande (from 1246 to 1255).

Transportation
Tournan station is the terminus station of the RER E (previously 'EOLE') regional railway line starting from the Gare Saint Lazare in Paris. It is also on a regional (Transilien) line to Coulommiers.

Demographics
Inhabitants of Tournan-en-Brie are called Tournanais in French.

See also
Communes of the Seine-et-Marne department

References

External links

Tournan-en-Brie City Hall website 
1999 Land Use, from IAURIF (Institute for Urban Planning and Development of the Paris-Île-de-France région) 
 

Communes of Seine-et-Marne